The 2019–20 Northern Iowa Panthers men's basketball team represented the University of Northern Iowa during the 2019–20 NCAA Division I men's basketball season. The Panthers, led by 14th-year head coach Ben Jacobson, played their home games at the McLeod Center in Cedar Falls, Iowa as members of the Missouri Valley Conference. They finished the season 25–6, 14–4 in MVC play to win the MVC regular season championship. They lost in the quarterfinals of the MVC tournament to Drake.  As a regular season conference champion who failed to win their conference tournament, they were set to receive an automatic bid to NIT. However, all postseason tournaments were cancelled amid the coronavirus pandemic.

Previous season
The Panthers finished the 2018–19 season 16–18, 9–9 in MVC play to finish in a three-way tie for fifth place. As the No. 6 seed in the MVC tournament, they beat Southern Illinois and Drake before losing to Bradley in the championship.

Offseason

Departures

2019 recruiting class

2020 recruiting class

Roster

Schedule and results

|-
!colspan=9 style=| Non-conference regular season

|-
!colspan=9 style=| Missouri Valley Conference regular season

|-
!colspan=9 style=| Missouri Valley tournament

Source

Panther Sports Network (PSN) Cedar Falls Utilities Ch. 15/HD415; KCRG-TV Ch. 9.2; WHO-DT Ch. 13.2; KGCW Ch. 26, (NBC Sports Chicago or NBCSC+)

References

Northern Iowa Panthers men's basketball seasons
Northern Iowa
Panth
Panth